Jacob Luke Hanson (born 30 November 1997) is an English professional footballer who plays for Macclesfield as a right back.

Career
Hanson signed for Huddersfield Town at the age of 13, from Kirkburton Juniors, turning professional two years later. He signed for Bradford City on transfer deadline day, 31 January 2017, alongside Charlie Wyke, Kevin Toner and Matthew Penney. He scored his first professional goal for Bradford on his debut in an EFL Trophy tie against Chesterfield on 29 August 2017. In January 2018, Hanson stated that he was inspired by Tyrell Robinson's breakthrough into the first-team. He moved on loan to Halifax Town in March 2018. He re-joined Halifax Town on loan in July 2018. Hanson joined Halifax on a permanent two-and-a-half year deal on 4 
January 2019 for an undisclosed fee. He left Halifax in November 2020 after the cancellation of his contract, joining Curzon Ashton.  In August 2021 he moved to FC United of Manchester before later joining Macclesfield on dual registration terms.

Playing style
Hanson began his career as a striker before becoming a right winger when he signed for Huddersfield, and then a right back, on account of his pace.

Career statistics

References

1997 births
Living people
English footballers
Huddersfield Town A.F.C. players
Bradford City A.F.C. players
FC Halifax Town players
English Football League players
National League (English football) players
Association football fullbacks
Macclesfield F.C. players
Curzon Ashton F.C. players